Jolanta Romanenko (born 6 June 1971) is a Lithuanian female paraglider pilot.

In 2013, Romanenko won first ever paragliding accuracy precision landing title in World Games.

References 

1971 births
Living people
Lithuanian paraglider pilots

World Games gold medalists
Competitors at the 2013 World Games